Livermore Investment Group is a listed company on the London Stock Exchange under the symbol LIV. Founded in 2006 as an investment Company it became an in the US Collateralized Loan Obligation market.

Corporate information
The company's board of directors includes:

Noam Lanir, Founder and Chief Executive Officer
Ron Baron, Founder, Executive Director And Chief Investment Officer
Richard Barry Rosenberg, Non-Executive Director
Augoustinos Papathomas, Non-Executive Director

Notes

External links 
Official investors site
Livermore Investments

Companies listed on the London Stock Exchange